Galactic Prisoners (or GP or G.P.) is a closed-end, play-by-mail (PBM) wargame.

History and development
Galactic Prisoners was a space-based, science fiction play-by-mail game published by Grandel, Inc. It was open-ended and computer moderated. The gamemaster was Ed Grandel.

Gameplay
Players begin on an alien planet with a "mammoth all terrain vehicle (ATV)". The timeframe is the year 2240 CE. After encountering a hostile alien race called the Nibor ("Robin" reversed), the few remaining humans fight for survival as planetary prisoners crewing their ATVs. Combat and exploration are elements of gameplay.

Reception
Terry Cannon reviewed the game in a 1991 issue of Paper Mayhem, stating that it was "unique, realistic, and exciting".

See also
 List of play-by-mail games

References

Bibliography

Further reading

 
 
 
 
 

Science fiction games
Multiplayer games
Play-by-mail games
Wargames